The Australian Fellowship of Evangelical Students  (AFES) is an evangelical Christian parachurch organisation that aims to encourage university students to believe in and follow Jesus Christ. It is affiliated with, and in 1947 was a founding member of the International Fellowship of Evangelical Students.

History
The young English evangelist, Howard Guinness, toured Australia in 1930 to encourage university students in evangelism. He helped form campus student groups starting in Sydney, then Melbourne, Brisbane and Hobart, including Sydney University Evangelical Union (SUEU) and Melbourne University Christian Union (MUCU - originally the Melbourne University Evangelical Union), which celebrated their 75th anniversaries in 2005. Guinness returned in 1933-1934 and founded groups in Perth and Adelaide.

These groups, led by the SUEU and the MUCU, joined together to form a network in 1936 as the Australian Intervarsity Fellowship or IVF, which later changed its name to the AFES in 1973. It had over 2000 members by 1959 and today has groups in over 50 campuses across the country in every state and territory, and employs over 100 staffworkers who look after the students on their various campuses.

In 2005, to celebrate the 75th anniversary of the first student groups in Australia, AFES ran a "Year of Tertiary Evangelism" involving coordinated events on university campuses throughout the country and the printing of 40000 copies of Mark's Gospel to be freely distributed throughout the year. The theme of the year was "For Christ's Sake", a phrase normally used in swearing, though used here to promote the Christian message itself. Besides the events on specific university campuses, the AFES ran various evangelistic rallies with many Christian groups from different universities attending.

Muriel Porter suggests that AFES is the "predominant student Christian organization across Australian universities," since the demise of the Student Christian Movement and the decline of diocesan-funded university chaplaincies.

Activities
AFES groups run a variety of activities, such as regular public Bible talks, smaller Bible studies, prayer groups, mid-year conferences and evangelistic outreach events. These activities are organised and run by both staff and students.

Each year in December, the AFES runs a National Training Event (NTE). This consists of a four- to five-day training conference, followed by several days of mission. The most recent NTE conference was hosted at Exhibition Park in Canberra (EPIC), and was attended by up to 1400 students from around Australia. The mission aspect of the NTE takes place in conjunction with churches around Australia.

Staff
The national director of AFES is Richard Chin. He was preceded by Kerry Nagel.

Staff are employed through AFES for the particular university campuses. Each staff member must raise his or her own financial support, which is sent to AFES by supporters and paid out to staff as a salary. (Many supporters of AFES staff are former AFES students who are now in paid employment.)

Staff usually are Staffworkers and Trainees, who usually work for a two-year "traineeship". After completing the traineeship, they may move to theological education and a more senior position.

Publications
AFES publishes a biannual magazine called Salt.

Criticism
Melbourne based journalist Muriel Porter has argued that AFES is an "outreach of Sydney Diocese in all but name" and "a Trojan horse for Sydney Anglican teaching around the country" though she admits that she is "obviously not able to report on Sydney objectively and even-handedly."  Porter suggests that AFES is also spreading "Sydney-style opposition to women in church leadership" in the Anglican Diocese of Melbourne and the Churches of Christ. She notes that students converted by AFES are bringing their "newly-acquired conservative stance into parish life."

See also
Christian Union
International Fellowship of Evangelical Students
International student ministry
Universities and Colleges Christian Fellowship
Ichthys
Campus Bible Study

References

External links
AFES website
AFES MP3 Library
CTindex listing

Protestantism in Australia
Student societies in Australia
Evangelical parachurch organizations
Christian organizations established in 1930
Student organizations established in 1930
Evangelical organizations established in the 20th century
Student religious organisations in Australia
1930 establishments in Australia